Alexandra Kertz-Welzel (born October 15, 1970) is Professor and Chair of Music Education at Ludwig-Maximilians-Universität in Munich, Germany. She studied at the Hochschule für Musik Saar and Saarland University in Saarbrücken, where she obtained Master's Degrees in music education, German studies, Philosophy, piano performance (class of Kristin Merscher), and harpsichord performance (class of Gerald Hambitzer), and was a scholarship holder from Cusanuswerk between 1992 and 2000. In 2000, she received a PhD degree in Musicology from Saarland University, with a dissertation on aesthetics in literature and music during the early romanticism in the Nineteenth century. Prior to her employment at LMU Munich in 2011, she was lecturer in music education at the Hochschule für Musik in Saarbrücken (2005–2011), and visiting scholar and lecturer in music education at the University of Washington in Seattle, Washington (2002–2005).

Publications 
Kertz-Welzel is the author of Every child for music: Musikpädagogik und Musikunterricht in den USA (2006), Patriotism and nationalism in music education (2012, along with David G. Hebert), and Globalizing music education: a framework (2018). Recent chapters on internationalizing music education, music education policy, community music, and transcultural childhoods, have appeared in international journals and handbooks.

Prof. Kertz-Welzel has given numerous lectures and keynotes at national and international conferences throughout Europe, in Brazil, China, Nepal, and the United States.

Professional Memberships and Activities 
Prof. Kertz-Welzel was co-chair of the ISME Commission on Policy: Culture, Education and Media from 2016–2018 of the International Society for Music Education (ISME), and chair of the International Society for the Philosophy of Music Education (ISPME) from 2017-2019. Additionally, she is editorial board member of international peer-reviewed journals, such as the Philosophy of Music Education Review, or the Journal of Historical Research in Music Education. At Ludwig-Maximilians-Universität in Munich, she was Excellence Initiative Mentor at the Faculty of History and the Arts from 2011–2017. In 2013, she founded the Munich Community Music Center (MCMC) at LMU Munich. From 2018-2020, she was Executive Director of the College of Arts at LMU Munich.

Books

References

External links
 Website of Alexandra Kertz-Welzel at LMU Munich.

1970 births
Living people
German musicologists
German music educators
People from Neunkirchen, Saarland
Saarland University alumni
Hochschule für Musik Saar alumni
Academic staff of the Ludwig Maximilian University of Munich